Tactusa peregovitsi is a moth of the family Erebidae first described by Michael Fibiger in 2010. It is known from northern Vietnam.

The wingspan is about 13 mm. The ground colour of the forewing is yellowish brown, with an acutely angled, triangular, blackish patch in the upper medial area and a black subterminal area, medially extended towards the base. Only the subterminal and terminal lines are indicated, the latter with interneural black spots. The hindwing is dark grey, with an indistinct discal spot and the underside is unicolorous grey.

References

Micronoctuini
Taxa named by Michael Fibiger
Moths described in 2010